Seonbu-dong is neighbourhood of Danwon-gu, Ansan, Gyeonggi Province, South Korea. It is officially divided into Seonbu-1-dong, Seonbu-2-dong and Seonbu-3-dong.

External links
 Seonbu-1-dong 
 Seonbu-2-dong 
 Seonbu-3-dong 

Danwon-gu
Neighbourhoods in Ansan